Helicodiscus diadema, common name the shaggy coil, is a species of small air-breathing land snail, a terrestrial pulmonate gastropod mollusk in the family Helicodiscidae.

Distribution
This species is found only in one small part of the state of Virginia, in the United States.

Conservation status
The survival of this species is "near endangered".

References

Helicodiscidae
Gastropods described in 1967
Taxonomy articles created by Polbot